Everton Hugh Mattis (born 11 April 1957) is a former West Indian cricketer who played in four Tests and two ODIs in 1981. In his maiden ODI, he scored a gritty 62 against England at Kingstown, St. Vincent. In the same match, West Indian pacer Collin Croft demolished the Englishmen with a figure of 9-4-15-6 to help the West Indies to defend the total of 127 and to win the match by 2 runs.  

Mattis' international career came to an end after he joined the rebel tours to South Africa in 1982-83 and 1983-84, defying the international sporting boycott of the apartheid state.

References

1957 births
Living people
West Indies Test cricketers
West Indies One Day International cricketers
Jamaican cricketers
Jamaica cricketers
Sportspeople from Kingston, Jamaica